This is a list of All-American Girls Professional Baseball League players who posted the best offensive marks in the history of the circuit.

Incidentally, the relatively low batting averages for many players reflect mainly the high quality of the AAGPBL pitchers, rather than a lack of skills by the hitters.

All time batting records
Minimum of 1,000 at bats
Bold denotes category leader.

Single game records

Single season records

Sources
 All-American Girls Professional Baseball League Record Book – W. C. Madden. Publisher: McFarland & Company, 2000. Format: Softcover, 294pp. Language: English.

See also
All-American Girls Professional Baseball League fielding records
All-American Girls Professional Baseball League pitching records

 
Baseball records